Channel 9 is a television station in Israel, formerly known as Israel Plus. It primarily broadcasts in the Russian language, with or without Hebrew subtitles, but also broadcasts some shows in Hebrew with Russian subtitles. As of 2013, it is primarily owned by investor Alexander Levin.

History
In September 2001, Africa Israel Investments, a financial group headed by Lev Leviev won the tender for the creation of Israel TV channel in Russian. Established in November 2002, the channel's first CEO was Yulia Shamalov-Berkovich, who led the company until February 2004.  The station began broadcasting on 12 November 2002.
 
In 2013 Africa Israel sold the channel to group of private investors led by Alexander Levin.

Market
The channel is aimed at the one million plus Russian speakers who have immigrated to the country since 1990. It was rebranded as Channel 9 (9 Kanal), the channel on which it is broadcast on cable and satellite. It is available in North America via free-to-air satellite on Galaxy 25.

See also
Russian language in Israel

References

External links

Television channels in Israel
Russian-language mass media in Israel
Russian-language television stations
Television channels and stations established in 2002
2002 establishments in Israel